The Church of St. Felix of Cantalice in Warsaw is located in the Wawer district, on Kościuszkowców Street. It was founded in 1935.

History
The parish was erected in 1958. The present parish church was built in the years 1928–1935 as the Felician Sisters' monastery church. 

The decision to build the church was made in 1927, and on August 29, 1929, Cardinal Aleksander Kakowski laid the foundation stone. In 1935, the church was consecrated. The church was designed by the Polish architect Zygmunt Gawlik.

On September 15, 1939, Adolf Hitler watched the defence of Warsaw from the church tower that dominated the neighborhood.

In November 1944, the church was damaged by German artillery fire. Since the church tower was an excellent landmark for the enemy, on November 28, 1944, Polish sappers, at the request of the sisters, blew it up. In 2007, the reconstruction of the main church tower was started and it was completed on March 12, 2008.

References

Wawer
Roman Catholic churches in Warsaw
Roman Catholic churches completed in 1935
Religious organizations established in the 1930s
20th-century Roman Catholic church buildings in Poland